Yoo Seon-Hee (Korean: 유선희, Hanja: 劉仙姫, born 20 May 1967) is a retired South Korean female speed skater. She represented her country at the 1988, 1992 and 1994 edition of Winter Olympics. At the 1994 games, she was a favourite leading up to the competition and had set the track record at the venue, but finished only fifth.

References

External links
Skateresults.com

Living people
1967 births
South Korean female speed skaters
Olympic speed skaters of South Korea
Speed skaters at the 1988 Winter Olympics
Speed skaters at the 1992 Winter Olympics
Speed skaters at the 1994 Winter Olympics
Asian Games medalists in speed skating
Speed skaters at the 1990 Asian Winter Games
Asian Games bronze medalists for South Korea
Medalists at the 1990 Asian Winter Games
Universiade gold medalists for South Korea
Universiade silver medalists for South Korea
Universiade medalists in speed skating
Competitors at the 1991 Winter Universiade
20th-century South Korean women